Hexaplex erythrostomus is a species of sea snail, a marine gastropod mollusk in the family Muricidae, the murex snails or rock snails.

Description
The shell of this species is globose and strong, ornamented with blunt spines. The aperture is circular. The siphonal canal is narrow, short and curved with decorations on the outside. The color of the outer part of the shell is white or shades of gray. The interior of the shell and the aperture is deep pink and glossy.

Distribution
The species occurs on the west coast of Mexico from Baja California to Peru.

Habitat
The species inhabits the intertidal and subtidal zones in sandy areas and sometimes on rocks

Gallery

References

 Lesson, A., 1844. Description de quatre espèces nouvelles de Murex. Echo du Monde Savant 23: 536-539
 Merle D., Garrigues B. & Pointier J.-P. (2011) Fossil and Recent Muricidae of the world. Part Muricinae. Hackenheim: Conchbooks. 648 pp.

External links
 Biodiversity Heritage Library: Bibliography for "Hexaplex erythrostomus"
 ZipcodeZoo.com: Hexaplex erythrostomus

Muricidae
Gastropods described in 1831